Bratuš is a village in Central Dalmatia, Croatia close to the city of Makarska. It is a small fishing and tourist village with fewer than 50 inhabitants outside the holiday season.

Close to the main tourist hub Makarska, Bratuš has managed to preserve its original atmosphere of a small fishing community.

Bratuš is mentioned for the first time in historical documents from 1674. Above the village, small prehistoric ruins with the name 'Gradina' can be found.

References

External links
 

Populated places in Split-Dalmatia County